Jariștea is a commune located in Vrancea County, Romania. It is composed of four villages: Jariștea, Pădureni, Scânteia and Vărsătura.

The  is in the commune.

References

Communes in Vrancea County
Localities in Western Moldavia